Ezazul Islam, M.B.B.S., DNM, known by his stage name as Dr. Ezaz, is a Bangladeshi physician and actor who appears in Bangladeshi television shows and films. Dr. Islam graduated with an MBBS from Rangpur Medical College in 1984 and a post-graduate diploma in nuclear medicine (DNM) from Bangabandhu Sheikh Mujib Medical University. He was the Head of Department of Nuclear Medicine at Dhaka Medical College and Hospital until his retirement in 2020. Dr. Islam is popularly known for his role as one of the recurring characters in Humayun Ahmed's television drama series, Tara Tin Jon.

Works

Films
 Srabon Megher Din (1999)
 Dui Duari (2001)
 Chandrokotha (2003)
 Shyamol Chhaya (2004)
 Tok Jhaal Mishti (2005)
 Noy Number Bipod Sanket (2006)
 Banglar Bou (2006)
 Mayer Morjada (2006)
 Bidrohi Padma (2006)
 Rupkothar Golpo (2006)
 Hridoyer Kotha (2006)
 Swamir Songshar (2007)
 Jhontu Montu Dui Bhai (2007)
 Tomakei Khujchi (2008)
 Amar Ache Jol (2008)
 Moynamotir Songshar (2010)
 Khoj: The Search (2010)
 Chaya Chobi (2012)
 Tumi Ashbe Bole (2012)
 Taarkata (2014)
 Parapaar (2014)
 Ek Cup Cha (2015)
 Ki Darun Dekhte (2014)
 Kothin Protishodh (2014)
 Prarthona (2015)
 Orpita (2018)
 Raat Jaga Phool (2021)

Drama Serial
 Ure Jai Bokpakkhi (2005)
 Sobuj Sathi 
 Chandra Karigor
 Vober Hat (2006-2007)
 Shanti Odhidoptor (2015)
 Nagar Jonaki (2015)
 Lorai (2015-2016)
 Jiboner Oligoli (2015-2016)
 Samraat (2016)
 Kokkho Number 52 (2016)
 Dhamaka Offer (2019)
 Shanti Molom 10 Taka (2022)

Web series 
 Sabrina (2022)

References

External links
 

Living people
Bangladeshi male film actors
Bangladeshi male television actors
Best Supporting Actor National Film Award (Bangladesh) winners
Academic staff of Dhaka Medical College and Hospital
Year of birth missing (living people)
Place of birth missing (living people)